Dollingstown is a large village in County Down, Northern Ireland, lying between Lurgan and Magheralin. It is within the Armagh, Banbridge and Craigavon district. In the 2011 Census it had a population of 2,103 people. Dollingstown is in the townland of Taughrane, which may come from Irish Tóchar Rathain ("causeway of bracken").

History
The village of Dollingstown is on the old road from Moira to Lurgan, and is in the townland of Taughrane, which may come from Irish Tóchar Rathain ("causeway of bracken") or Teach Raithin ("house of bracken"). It is said to be named from the Rev. Boghey Dolling, rector of the parish of Magheralin, who lived there in the 19th century. Dollingstown is not represented on 18th century maps, which suggests that Dollingstown probably didn't exist until the 1800s. Taughrane in its current spelling was first used in 1661. However,  it had a variety of different spellings, beginning in 1655: Teaghrayne (1655), Tagharan (1657), Taghrane (1657), and then Taughrane in 1661.

Sport

Dollingstown F.C. 
Dollingstown's football club is Dollingstown F.C. They play in the NIFL Premier Intermediate League. Dollingstown F.C.'s home stadium is Planters Park and the club was founded in 1979 by local football fanatics. The club contains 2 sub-teams, the 1s and the 2s. They both have separate Management teams. 

1s Team Management

Team Manager: Steven Uprichard (the Official Manager of Dollingstown F.C.)

Assistant Manager: Andy Hamilton

2s Team Management

Team Manager: Steven Park

Assistant Manager: Peter Wright

Sponsors 
Dollingstown F.C. has 54 team sponsors. Notable sponsors of the club include: Huhtamäki, Christians Against Poverty, Lurgan Credit Union Ltd, Trinity Park, Clubworld Travel, Seagoe Hotel, Haffey Sports Grounds, Decor8, Tughans, Next Level Sports, A&H Nicholson, Brian Uprichard Fuels and Linton Sports Ground Solutions.

2010-11 Season Incident 
In the 2010–11 season, Dollingstown F.C. was rejected a promotion to IFA Championship 2 for allowing an ineligible player to play in eight league matches. Consequently, they were withdrew of all the points they had obtained in the matches the player took part in, and finished in 4th place instead of 1st. In response, the decision was appealed by the club. The club ended up taking their case all the way to the High Court. However, it was dismissed. If Dollingstown F.C. had won their case, they would have been promoted, which would lead to Chimney Corner being relegated. Tandragee Rovers ended up being declared champions of the division instead, but did not apply for their entry to the Championship.

The Church 
Dollingstown's church is called Magheralin Parish. Magheralin Parish began in Magheralin, but later added a new Church building in Dollingstown. However, despite the two different locations, they are the same church. Sermons take place on a Sunday at 10am in Dollingstown, and 11:30am in Magheralin. Magheralin also has an evening service at 6:30pm. In addition to this, The Rector of Magheralin Parish is Simon Genoe, and the Youth Outreach Coordinator is Richard Lyttle.

Demography
Dollingstown is currently classified as a Village according to the NISRA (Northern Ireland Statistics and Research agency). The definition of a ‘village’ settlement is that it has a population of 1,000 people or more and is less than 2,250 people.

2011 Census
The population of Dollingstown on Census day (27 March 2011) was 2,103 people.

The demographic characteristics of the people living in Dollingstown was as follows:
22.68% were aged under 16 years;
12.89% were aged 65 and over;
the average age was 38 years;
49.03% of the population were male and 50.97% were female;;
6.42% were from a Catholic Community Background;
85.83% were from a 'Protestant and Other Christian (including Christian related and Stuartism)' Community Background;
8.33% were born outside Northern Ireland; and
2.04% were from an ethnic group other than white.

References

See also
List of towns and villages in Northern Ireland

Villages in County Down
Civil parish of Magheralin